Adam Šukalo (born 2 September 1978) is a Bosnian Serb politician. He served in the National Assembly of the Republika Srpska from 2014 to 2018 as a member of Napredna Srpska. He subsequently relocated to Belgrade, Serbia, and has served in the National Assembly of Serbia since 2020 as a member of the Serbian Progressive Party (Srpska napredna stranka, SNS).

Early life and career
Šukalo was born in Gradiška, in what was then the Socialist Republic of Bosnia and Herzegovina in the Socialist Federal Republic of Yugoslavia. He later moved to Banja Luka. Šukalo holds a Bachelor of Laws degree.

Politician

Republika Srpska
Šukalo was the leader of the Serbian Progressive Party of Republika Srpska in the early 2010s, when the party was aligned with the Progressive Party in Serbia. He was a Progressive candidate in the 2010 Republika Srpska general election, in which the party did not cross the electoral threshold to win representation in the assembly. The Republika Srpska Progressives subsequently became divided between different factions and Šukalo became the leader of a new party called Napredna Srpska (English: "Progressive Srpska") following a split in 2013.

Napredna Srpska contested the 2014 Republika Srpska general election on an electoral list led by the Democratic People's Alliance (Demokratski narodni savez, DNS), and Šukalo was elected to the assembly after being awarded a compensatory mandate under the Republika Srpska's system of proportional representation. Following the election, Šukalo called for a "grand coalition" government between the two largest parties, the rival Alliance of Independent Social Democrats (Savez nezavisnih socijaldemokrata, SNSD) and Serb Democratic Party (Srpska demokratska stranka, SDS). In so doing, he suggested the prospect of Napredna Srpska acting as a bridge between the parties. This ultimately did not occur; the DNS joined a coalition government led by the SNSD, and Napredna Srpska became part of the Alliance for Change, a coalition of opposition parties.

In 2017, Šukalo called for stronger inter-communal relations in Bosnia and Herzegovina and identified both Republika Srpska president Milorad Dodik and Party of Democratic Action leader Bakir Izetbegović as obstacles to progress.

Šukalo was replaced as leader of Naprenda Srpska by Goran Đorđić in March 2017. This occurred against the backdrop of merger negotiations with the Party of Democratic Progress (Partija demokratskog progresa, PDP). Šukalo subsequently announced that he would sit in caucus with the PDP as an independent member.

During his time in the Republika Srpska assembly, Šukalo was a frequent critic of the Dodik administration and was known for his verbal battles with interior minister Dragan Lukač. He was also a prominent member of the "Justice of David" movement, calling for an investigation into the death of David Dragičević. He served on the Committee for European integration and regional cooperation. and

He sought election to the House of Representatives of Bosnia and Herzegovina in the 2018 Bosnian general election on the PDP's electoral list and was narrowly defeated.

Member of the National Assembly of Serbia
Šukalo received the 125th position on the Serbian Progressive Party's Aleksandar Vučić — For Our Children coalition list in the 2020 Serbian parliamentary election and was elected when the list won a landslide majority with 188 out of 250 mandates. He is now a member of the committee on administrative, budgetary, mandate, and immunity issues; a deputy member of the European integration committee and the committee on constitutional and legislative issues; a substitute member of Serbia's delegation to the Parliamentary Dimension of the Central European Initiative; and a member of the parliamentary friendship groups with Azerbaijan, Bosnia and Herzegovina, Brazil, Cuba, Germany, Greece, Italy, Montenegro, North Macedonia, Russia, Spain, and the United States of America.

Election results

Republika Srpska

References

1978 births
Living people
People from Gradiška, Bosnia and Herzegovina
People from Banja Luka
Politicians of Republika Srpska
Members of the National Assembly (Serbia)
Substitute members of the Parliamentary Dimension of the Central European Initiative
Serbian Progressive Party politicians
Serbs of Bosnia and Herzegovina